Thala is a genus of sea snails, marine gastropod mollusks in the family Costellariidae.

Species
Species within the genus Thala include:
 Thala abelai Rosenberg & Salisbury, 2014
 Thala adamsi Rosenberg & Salisbury, 2003
 Thala angiostoma Pease, 1868
 Thala aubryi Turner, Gori & Salisbury, 2007
 † Thala burdigalensis Peyrot, 1928 
 Thala cernica (Sowerby II, 1874)
 Thala evelynae Rosenberg & Salisbury, 2014
 Thala exilis (Reeve, 1845)
 Thala exquisita Garrett, 1872
 Thala gloriae Rosenberg & Salisbury, 2003
 Thala gorii Rosenberg & Salisbury, 2003
 Thala hilli Rosenberg & Salisbury, 2007
 Thala jaculanda (Gould, 1860)
 Thala kawabei Herrmann & Chino, 2015
 Thala kilburni Rosenberg & Salisbury, 2014
 Thala lillicoi Rosenberg & Salisbury, 2007
 Thala maldivensis Turner, Gori & Salisbury, 2007
 Thala malvacea Jousseaume, 1898
 Thala manolae Turner, Gori & Salisbury, 2007
 Thala merrilli Rosenberg & Salisbury, 2014
 Thala milium (Reeve, 1845) 
 Thala minagaorum Herrmann & Chino, 2015
 Thala mirifica (Reeve, 1845)
 Thala ogasarawana Pilsbry, 1904
 Thala pallida Rosenberg & Salisbury, 2014
  † Thala partschi (Hörnes, 1852)
 Thala pembaensis Herrmann & Gori, 2012 
 Thala recurva (Reeve, 1845)
 Thala roseata (A. Adams, 1855)
 Thala ruggeriae Rosenberg & Salisbury, 2014
 Thala secalina (Gould, 1860)
 Thala simulans (Martens, 1880)
 Thala suduirauti Rosenberg & Salisbury, 2014
 Thala todilla (Mighels, 1845)
 Thala turneri Salisbury & Gori, 2013
 Thala violacea Garrett, 1872

Species brought into synonymy
 Thala africana Rolàn & Fernandes, 1996: synonym of Mitromica africana (Rolàn & Fernandes, 1996)
 Thala alba Pease, 1868: synonym of Mitra typha Reeve, 1845: synonym of Carinomitra typha (Reeve, 1845)
 Thala ceylanica Preston, 1904: synonym of Thala jaculanda (Gould, 1860)
 Thala crassa (Simone, 1995): synonym of Nodicostellaria crassa (Simone, 1995)
 Thala decaryi (Dautzenberg, 1932): synonym of Mitromica decaryi (Dautzenberg, 1932)
 Thala esperanza Leal & Moore, 1993: synonym of Mitromica esperanza Leal & Moore, 1993
 Thala floridana (Dall, 1884): synonym of Mitromica foveata (G. B. Sowerby II, 1874)
 Thala exquisita (Garrett, 1873): synonym of Vexillum (Pusia) exquisitum (Garrett, 1873)
 Thala foveata (G.B. Sowerby II, 1874): synonym of Mitromica foveata (G.B. Sowerby II, 1874)
 Thala gratiosa (Reeve, 1845): synonym of Mitromica gratiosa (Reeve, 1845)
 Thala illecebra (Melvill, 1927): synonym of Thala milium (Reeve, 1845)
 Thala jacalanda [sic]: synonym of Thala jaculanda (Gould, 1860)
 Thala jeancateae Sphon, 1969: synonym of Mitromica jeancateae (Sphon, 1969)
 Thala maxmarrowi Cernohorsky, 1980: synonym of Thaluta maxmarrowi (Cernohorsky, 1980)
 † Thala obsoleta (Brocchi, 1814): synonym of † Bellardithala obsoleta (Brocchi, 1814) 
 Thala ogasarawana [sic]: synonym of Thala ogasawarana Pilsbry, 1904
 Thala saltata (Pease, 1865): synonym of Carinomitra saltata (Pease, 1865)
 Thala solitaria (C. B. Adams, 1852): synonym of Mitromica solitaria (C. B. Adams, 1852)

References

 Turner H. (2001) Katalog der Familie Costellariidae Macdonald 1860 (Gastropoda: Prosobranchia: Muricoidea). Hackenheim: Conchbooks. 100 pp.

External links
 Rosenberg & Salisbury, Seven new species of Thala (Gastropoda: Costellariidae) from the Indo-Pacific;  Proceedings of the  Academy of Natural Sciences of Philadelphia  163: 179-223 (2014)
 Adams, H. & Adams, A. (1853-1858). The genera of Recent Mollusca; arranged according to their organization. London, van Voorst. Vol. 1: xl + 484 pp.; vol. 2: 661 pp.; vol. 3: 138 pls. 
 Fedosov A.E., Puillandre N., Herrmann M., Dgebuadze P. & Bouchet P. (2017). Phylogeny, systematics, and evolution of the family Costellariidae (Gastropoda: Neogastropoda). Zoological Journal of the Linnean Society. 179(3): 541-626

Costellariidae